Marcelo Tavares is a video game specialist and the biggest "Brazilian videogames collector". Born in Niterói, Rio de Janeiro, Tavares has more than 350 video game consoles, around 3,500 games, and hundreds of accessories in his collection. He is the organizer of Brasil Game Show, the largest gaming convention in Latin America. He was interviewed by many popular TV shows in Brazil including Danilo Gentili (SBT) and Jô Soares (TV Globo).

Among the devices, some may be highlighted like classic videogames: Atari 2600, Teleplay, Odyssey, Master System, NES, Famicom, SNES, Mega Drive, and Game Boy. There are also some rare ones: Virtual Boy, Pippin, Microvision, Channel F, Game & Watch, 3DO, Vectrex and Amiga CD 32.

History 

Some notable achievements by Tavares:
1986 – Tavares played Atari for the first time ever;
1996 – Started his collection; 
2002 – Created the Game Churrasco, a small party in which the main themes were videogames;
2003 – Was the producer and the host of the TV show Game News (Channel 36);
2005 – Wrote for the newspaper Jornal da cidade;
2005 – Created the game column at the JB Online; 
2008 – Exposed part of his Collection at the National Museum of Fine Arts in Rio;
2008 – Was the editor of the GameNews Magazine;
2008 – Wrote for the Fluminense Newspaper;
2009 – Organized the first Rio Game Show in Niterói; 
2009 – Columnist at the TI Digital Magazine;
2009 – Signed the videogames Column at the Topblog award; 
2010 – The Rio Game Show grew and became Brasil Game Show (BGS), with its first edition in 2010 at the SulAmérica Convention Center in Rio; 
2010 – Wrote for the O Globo's magazine Megazine; 
2011 – The year Brasil Game Show the biggest videogames Fair of Latin America. It was held in Rio and had 60 thousand visitors and 92 exhibitors;
2012 – Brasil Game Show moved to Expo Center North in São Paulo, where it had more than 100 thousand visitors.
2013 – 150 thousand visitors were at BGS, which occupied two pavilions at the Expo Center North;
2014 – Marcelo was still in charge of the Brasil Game Show, which, at this time, had more than 250 thousand visitors during the five days of the Fair. In its seventh edition, BGS occupied all five pavilions at the Expo Center North. In this edition, BGS collected from the visitors more than 70 tons of food for the House of David.
2015 – Marcelo remained with the greatness of the Fair, which was still held in São Paulo, occupying all five pavilions at the Expo Center North.

References

Brazilian collectors
Living people
Year of birth missing (living people)